James Batchelor (born 9 April 1998) is a professional rugby league footballer who plays as a  forward for Hull KR in the Super League and the England Knights at international level.

He has spent time on loan from Wakefield at the Dewsbury Rams in the Championship.

Background
Batchelor's youth team was Crigglestone All Blacks; he was picked up by Wakefield Trinity via the Wakefield College team. 

He is the brother of Joe Batchelor who plays for St Helens in the Super League.

Career
Batchelor played eight games in 2017 before picking up a hip injury that ended his season.
After six years at Wakefield Trinity, Batchelor announced that he had signed a two-year deal to join Hull Kingston Rovers ahead of the 2023 season.

International career
In July 2018 he was selected in the England Knights Performance squad. Later that year he was selected for the England Knights on their tour of Papua New Guinea. He played against Papua New Guinea at the Lae Football Stadium.

References

External links
Wakefield Trinity profile
Wakefield Trinity Wildcats profile
SL profile

1998 births
Living people
Dewsbury Rams players
England Knights national rugby league team players
English rugby league players
Hull Kingston Rovers players
Rugby league players from Wakefield
Rugby league second-rows
Wakefield Trinity players